Vuokalanjärvi is a medium-sized lake in the Vuoksi main catchment area. It is located in the region Southern Savonia and the municipality of Savonlinna.

See also
List of lakes in Finland

References

Nature of Savonlinna